Mauka-E-Vardaat is an Indian Hindi-language crime show aired by &TV. The series is hosted by Sapna Choudhary, Manoj Tiwari, Ravi Kishan, and Mona Singh.

The Crime Series Is Produced by

By RaviRaj Creations, Hemant Prabhu Studioz, A&I Productions and Salker,a ker  Babul Bhasin, Chital Tripathi, Rajesh Tripathi, HePrabhu,Pbhu & Anshuman PrSingh and othersilms,

Plot
The hosts present dramatised re-enactments of real-life crime cases that revolve around harassment, kidnapping and murder. An anthology of stories that deal with heinous crimes and put the spotlight on the victims who are often faced with a dilemma to choose between right and wrong.

Host

 Manoj Tiwari as Host
 Ravi Kishan as Host
 Sapna Choudhary as Host
Mona Singh as Host

Cast

Piyush Sahdev as Senior Inspector Piyush Rathore 
Gaurav Khanna as Senior Inspector Gaurav Singh Rajput 
Shahbaz Khan as Senior Inspector Shahnawaz Khan
Aman Verma as Senior Inspector Abhay Talwar
Chetan Hansraj as Senior Inspector  Harshvardhan Shekhawat
Ankit Arora as Senior Inspector Rishiraj Pandey
Kannan Arunachalam as Senior Inspector Srikant Iyyer
Surendra Jha as Inspector Ram Singh
Ansha Sayed as Inspector Anwesha Purohit
Sonali Nikam as Inspector Kriti
Tanya Abrol as Inspector Surabhi Kaur
Poorti Arya as Rakshita Dussera special episode
Abhishek Singh Rajput as Arun

Operation Vijay - Supernatural Cases Cast

Ankit Arora as Inspector Rishiraj Pandey 
Ansha Sayed as Inspector Anwesha Purohit 
Narendra Gupta as Newton Chattopadhyay 235-year-old genius Episode 77 - 93
Piyush Sahdev as Inspector Piyush Rathore 
Sonali Nikam as Inspector Kriti 
Aman Verma as Inspector Abhay Talwar   
Chetan Hansraj as Senior Inspector Harshvardhan Shekhawat  
Shahbaz Khan as Senior Inspector Shahnawaz Khan

References

External links 
 
 Muaka-E-Vardaat on ZEE5

2021 Indian television series debuts
Hindi-language television shows
Indian crime television series